This page lists all described species of the spider family Nemesiidae accepted by the World Spider Catalog :

A

Amblyocarenum

Amblyocarenum Simon, 1892
 A. doleschalli (Ausserer, 1871) — Italy (mainland, Sicily)
 A. nuragicum Decae, Colombo & Manunza, 2014 — Italy (Sardinia)
 A. obscurum (Ausserer, 1871) — Italy (Sicily)
 A. walckenaeri (Lucas, 1846) (type) — Mediterranean

B

Brachythele

Brachythele Ausserer, 1871
 Brachythele bentzieni Zonstein, 2007 — Greece
 Brachythele denieri (Simon, 1916) — Greece, Bulgaria
 Brachythele icterica (C. L. Koch, 1838) (type) — Italy, Croatia, North Macedonia
 Brachythele incerta Ausserer, 1871 — Cyprus
 Brachythele langourovi Lazarov, 2005 — Bulgaria
 Brachythele media Kulczyński, 1897 — Slovenia, Croatia, Albania
 Brachythele rhodopensis (Dimitrov & Zonstein, 2022) — Bulgaria
 Brachythele speculatrix Kulczyński, 1897 — SE Europe (Balkans)
 Brachythele varrialei (Dalmas, 1920) — Eastern Europe
 Brachythele zonsteini (Özkütük, Yağmur, Elverici, Gücel, Altunsoy & Kunt, 2022) — Turkey

C

Calisoga

Calisoga Chamberlin, 1937
 C. anomala (Schenkel, 1950) — USA
 C. centronetha (Chamberlin & Ivie, 1939) — USA
 C. longitarsis (Simon, 1891) — USA
 C. sacra Chamberlin, 1937 (type) — USA
 C. theveneti (Simon, 1891) — USA

Chaco

Chaco Tullgren, 1905
 C. ansilta Ferretti, 2014 — Argentina
 C. castanea Montes de Oca & Pérez-Miles, 2013 — Uruguay
 C. costai Montes de Oca & Pérez-Miles, 2013 — Uruguay
 C. melloleitaoi (Bücherl, Timotheo & Lucas, 1971) — Brazil
 C. obscura Tullgren, 1905 (type) — Argentina
 C. patagonica Goloboff, 1995 — Argentina
 C. sanjuanina Goloboff, 1995 — Argentina
 C. socos Goloboff, 1995 — Chile
 C. tecka Goloboff, 1995 — Argentina
 C. tigre Goloboff, 1995 — Chile
 C. tingua Indicatti, Folly-Ramos, Vargas, Lucas & Brescovit, 2015 — Brazil
 C. tucumana Goloboff, 1995 — Argentina

Chilelopsis

Chilelopsis Goloboff, 1995
 C. calderoni Goloboff, 1995 (type) — Chile
 C. puertoviejo Goloboff, 1995 — Chile
 C. serena Goloboff, 1995 — Chile

D

Damarchilus

Damarchilus Siliwal, Molur & Raven, 2015
 D. nigricus Siliwal, Molur & Raven, 2015 (type) — India
 D. rufus Siliwal, Molur & Raven, 2015 — India

Diplothelopsis

Diplothelopsis Tullgren, 1905
 D. bonariensis Mello-Leitão, 1938 — Argentina
 D. ornata Tullgren, 1905 (type) — Argentina

E

† Eodiplurina

† Eodiplurina Petrunkevitch, 1922
 † E. cockerelli Petrunkevitch, 1922

F

Flamencopsis

Flamencopsis Goloboff, 1995
 F. minima Goloboff, 1995 (type) — Chile

G

Gravelyia

Gravelyia Mirza & Mondal, 2018
 Gravelyia boro (Basumatary & Brahma, 2021)  — India
 Gravelyia excavatus (Gravely, 1921) (type) — India
 Gravelyia striatus Mirza & Mondal, 2018 — India

H

Hermachura

Hermachura Mello-Leitão, 1923
 H. luederwaldti Mello-Leitão, 1923 (type) — Brazil

I

Iberesia

Iberesia Decae & Cardoso, 2006
 I. arturica Calvo, 2020 — Spain
 I. barbara (Lucas, 1846) — Morocco, Algeria, Spain
 I. brauni (L. Koch, 1882) — Spain (incl. Balearic Is.)
 I. castillana (Frade & Bacelar, 1931) — Spain
 I. machadoi Decae & Cardoso, 2006 (type) — Portugal, Spain
 I. valdemoriana Luis de la Iglesia, 2019 — Spain

L

Longistylus

Longistylus Indicatti & Lucas, 2005
 L. ygapema Indicatti & Lucas, 2005 (type) — Brazil

Lycinus

Lycinus Thorell, 1894
Lycinus bonariensis (Mello-Leitão, 1938) – Argentina
Lycinus caldera Goloboff, 1995 – Chile
Lycinus choros Lucas & Indicatti, 2010 – Chile
Lycinus domeyko Goloboff, 1995 – Chile
Lycinus epipiptus (Zapfe, 1963) – Chile, Argentina
Lycinus frayjorge Goloboff, 1995 – Chile
Lycinus gajardoi (Mello-Leitão, 1940) – Chile
Lycinus lagigliai Ferretti, 2015 – Argentina
Lycinus longipes Thorell, 1894 (type species) – Argentina
Lycinus nevadoensis Ferretti, 2015 – Argentina
Lycinus ornatus (Tullgren, 1905) – Argentina
Lycinus portoseguro Lucas & Indicatti, 2010 – Brazil
Lycinus quilicura Goloboff, 1995 – Chile
Lycinus tofo Goloboff, 1995 – Chile

M

Mexentypesa

Mexentypesa Raven, 1987
 M. chiapas Raven, 1987 (type) — Mexico

N

Nemesia

Nemesia Audouin, 1826
 N. africana (C. L. Koch, 1838) — Algeria
 N. albicomis Simon, 1914 — France (Corsica)
 N. algerina Zonstein, 2019 — Algeria
 N. almoravida Zonstein, 2019 — Algeria
 N. amicitia (Pertegal & Molero-Baltanás, 2022) — Spain
 N. angustata Simon, 1873 — Spain
 N. annaba Zonstein, 2019 — Algeria
 N. apenninica Decae, Pantini & Isaia, 2015 — Italy
 N. arboricola Pocock, 1903 — Malta
 N. arenicola Simon, 1892 — France (Corsica)
 N. asterix Decae & Huber, 2017 — Italy (Sardinia)
 N. athiasi Franganillo, 1920 — Portugal, Spain
 N. bacelarae Decae, Cardoso & Selden, 2007 — Portugal, Spain
 N. berlandi Frade & Bacelar, 1931 — Portugal
 N. bristowei Decae, 2005 — Spain (Majorca)
 N. budensis Kolosváry, 1939 — Hungary
 N. caementaria (Latreille, 1799) — Southern Europe
 N. caranhaci Decae, 1995 — Greece (Crete)
 N. carminans (Latreille, 1818) — France
 N. cecconii Kulczyński, 1907 — Italy
 N. cellicola Audouin, 1826 (type) — Mediterranean
 N. coheni Fuhn & Polenec, 1967 — Romania, Bulgaria
 N. cominensis (Cassar, Mifsud & Decae, 2022) — Malta
 N. congener O. Pickard-Cambridge, 1874 — France
 N. corsica Simon, 1914 — France (Corsica)
 N. crassimana Simon, 1873 — Spain
 N. cubana (Franganillo, 1930) — Cuba
 N. cypriatica (Özkütük, Yağmur, Elverici, Gücel, Altunsoy & Kunt, 2022) — Cyprus
 N. daedali Decae, 1995 — Greece (Crete)
 N. decaei Zonstein, 2019 — Algeria
 N. didieri Simon, 1892 — Algeria
 N. dido Zonstein, 2019 — Algeria
 N. dorthesi Thorell, 1875 — Spain, Morocco, Algeria
 N. dubia (Karsch, 1878) — Mozambique
 N. dubia O. Pickard-Cambridge, 1874 — Spain, France
 N. eleanora O. Pickard-Cambridge, 1873 — France
 N. entinae (Calvo & Pagán, 2022) — Spain
 N. fagei Frade & Bacelar, 1931 — Portugal
 N. fertoni Simon, 1914 — France (Corsica), Italy (Sardinia)
 N. f. sardinea Simon, 1914 — Italy (Sardinia)
 N. hastensis Decae, Pantini & Isaia, 2015 — Italy
 N. hispanica L. Koch, 1871 — Spain
 N. ibiza Decae, 2005 — Spain (Ibiza)
 N. ilvae Caporiacco, 1950 — Italy
 N. incerta O. Pickard-Cambridge, 1874 — France
 N. kahmanni Kraus, 1955 — Italy (Sardinia)
 N. macrocephala Ausserer, 1871 — Italy (Sicily), Malta, Algeria?
 N. m. occidentalis Frade & Bacelar, 1931 — Spain
 N. maculatipes Ausserer, 1871 — France (Corsica), Italy (Sardinia), Morocco?
 N. maltensis (Cassar, Mifsud & Decae, 2022) — Malta
 N. manderstjernae L. Koch, 1871 — France
 N. meridionalis (Costa, 1835) — Spain, France, Italy, Algeria?
 N. pannonica Herman, 1879 — Eastern Europe
 N. pavani Dresco, 1978 — Italy
 N. pedemontana Decae, Pantini & Isaia, 2015 — Italy
 N. qarthadasht (Calvo, 2021) — Spain
 N. randa Decae, 2005 — Spain (Majorca)
 N. raripila Simon, 1914 — Spain, France
 N. rastellata Wunderlich, 2011 — Greece (Karpathos)
 N. santeugenia Decae, 2005 — Spain (Majorca)
 N. santeulalia Decae, 2005 — Spain (Ibiza)
 N. sanzoi Fage, 1917 — Italy (Sicily)
 N. seldeni Decae, 2005 — Spain (Majorca)
 N. shenlongi (Pertegal, García, Molero-Baltanás & Knapp, 2022) — Spain
 N. simoni O. Pickard-Cambridge, 1874 — Portugal, Spain, France
 N. sinensis Pocock, 1901 — China
 N. tanit Zonstein, 2019 — Algeria
 N. transalpina (Doleschall, 1871) — Italy
 N. uncinata Bacelar, 1933 — Portugal, Spain
 N. ungoliant Decae, Cardoso & Selden, 2007 — Portugal
 N. valenciae Kraus, 1955 — Spain, Morocco

Neostothis

Neostothis Vellard, 1925
 N. gigas Vellard, 1925 (type) — Brazil

P

Prorachias

Prorachias Mello-Leitão, 1924
 P. bristowei Mello-Leitão, 1924 (type) — Brazil

Psalistopoides

Psalistopoides Mello-Leitão, 1934
 P. emanueli Lucas & Indicatti, 2006 — Brazil
 P. fulvimanus Mello-Leitão, 1934 (type) — Brazil

Pselligmus

Pselligmus Simon, 1892
 P. infaustus Simon, 1892 (type) — Brazil

R

Rachias

Rachias Simon, 1892
 R. aureus (Mello-Leitão, 1920) — Brazil
 R. brachythelus (Mello-Leitão, 1937) — Brazil
 R. caudatus (Piza, 1939) — Brazil
 R. conspersus (Walckenaer, 1837) — Brazil
 R. dispar (Simon, 1891) (type) — Brazil
 R. dolichosternus (Mello-Leitão, 1938) — Brazil
 R. iricolor (Mello-Leitão, 1923) — Brazil
 R. odontochilus Mello-Leitão, 1923 — Brazil
 R. piracicabensis Piza, 1938 — Brazil
 R. timbo Goloboff, 1995 — Argentina
 R. virgatus Vellard, 1924 — Brazil

Raveniola

Raveniola Zonstein, 1987
 Raveniola adjarica Zonstein, Kunt & Yağmur, 2018 — Georgia
 Raveniola alpina Li & Zonstein, 2015 — China
 Raveniola ambardzumyani Marusik & Zonstein, 2021 — Armenia
 Raveniola anadolu Zonstein, Kunt & Yağmur, 2018 — Turkey
 Raveniola arthuri Kunt & Yağmur, 2010 — Turkey
 Raveniola beelzebub Lin & Li, 2020 — China
 Raveniola bellula Li & Zonstein, 2015 — China
 Raveniola birecikensis Zonstein, Kunt & Yağmur, 2018 — Turkey
 Raveniola caudata Zonstein, 2009 — Tajikistan
 Raveniola chayi Li & Zonstein, 2015 — China
 Raveniola concolor Zonstein, 2000 — Pakistan
 Raveniola dunini Zonstein, Kunt & Yağmur, 2018 — Armenia, Azerbaijan, Iran
 Raveniola fedotovi (Charitonov, 1946) — Central Asia
 Raveniola ferghanensis (Zonstein, 1984) — Kyrgyzstan
 Raveniola gracilis Li & Zonstein, 2015 — China
 Raveniola guangxi (Raven & Schwendinger, 1995) — China
 Raveniola hebeinica Zhu, Zhang & Zhang, 1999 — China
 Raveniola hyrcanica Dunin, 1988 — Azerbaijan
 Raveniola jundai (Lin & Li, 2022) — China
 Raveniola kopetdaghensis (Fet, 1984) — Turkmenistan
 Raveniola lamia Yu & Zhang, 2021 — China
 Raveniola marusiki Zonstein, Kunt & Yağmur, 2018 — Iran
 Raveniola mazandaranica Marusik, Zamani & Mirshamsi, 2014 — Iran
 Raveniola micropa (Ausserer, 1871) — Turkey
 Raveniola mikhailovi Zonstein, 2021 — Kyrgyzstan
 Raveniola montana Zonstein & Marusik, 2012 — China
 Raveniola nana Zonstein, Kunt & Yağmur, 2018 — Turkey
 Raveniola niedermeyeri (Brignoli, 1972) — Iran
 Raveniola pontica (Spassky, 1937) — Russia (Caucasus), Georgia
 Raveniola redikorzevi (Spassky, 1937) — Turkmenistan
 Raveniola rugosa Li & Zonstein, 2015 — China
 Raveniola shangrila Zonstein & Marusik, 2012 — China
 Raveniola sinani Zonstein, Kunt & Yağmur, 2018 — Turkey
 Raveniola songi Zonstein & Marusik, 2012 — China
 Raveniola spirula Li & Zonstein, 2015 — China
 Raveniola turcica Zonstein, Kunt & Yağmur, 2018 — Turkey
 Raveniola virgata (Simon, 1891) (type) — Central Asia
 Raveniola vonwicki Zonstein, 2000 — Iran
 Raveniola xizangensiss (Hu & Li, 1987) — China
 Raveniola yajiangensis Li & Zonstein, 2015 — China
 Raveniola yangren (Lin & Li, 2022) — China
 Raveniola yunnanensis Zonstein & Marusik, 2012 — China
 Raveniola zaitzevi (Charitonov, 1948) — Azerbaijan, Georgia

S

Sinopesa

Sinopesa Raven & Schwendinger, 1995
Sinopesa chengbuensis (Xu & Yin, 2002) — China
Sinopesa chinensis (Kulczyński, 1901) — China
Sinopesa gollum Lin & Li, 2021 — China
Sinopesa guansheng Lin & Li, 2023 — China
Sinopesa kumensis Shimojana & Haupt, 2000 — Japan (Ryukyu Is.)
Sinopesa maculata Raven & Schwendinger, 1995 — Thailand
Sinopesa ninhbinhensis Li & Zonstein, 2015 — Vietnam
Sinopesa sinensis (Zhu & Mao, 1983) — China

References

Nemesiidae